The tree bat (Ardops nichollsi) is a species of bat in the family Phyllostomidae and the only species in the genus Ardops. It is found in Dominica, Guadeloupe, Martinique, Montserrat, Netherlands Antilles, Saint Lucia, Saba, Saint Martin, Sint Eustatius, Saint Kitts, Nevis, Grenada and Saint Vincent and the Grenadines.

References

Phyllostomidae
Mammals described in 1891
Taxonomy articles created by Polbot
Bats of the Caribbean
Taxa named by Oldfield Thomas